Monte Cadria is a mountain in the Alps located in Italy. It is the highest peak of the Brescia and Garda Prealps.

Geography 
Administratively the mountain belongs to the Italian region of Trentino Alto Adige/Südtirol and to the province of Trento.

SOIUSA classification 
According to SOIUSA (International Standardized Mountain Subdivision of the Alps) the mountain can be classified in the following way:
 main part = Eastern Alps
 major sector = Central Eastern Alps
 section = Brescia and Garda Prealps
 subsection =  Prealpi Gardesane
 supergroup = Prealpi Giudicarie
 group = Gruppo del Cadria
 code = II/C-30.II-A.1

References

External links 
 Monte Cadria on www.summitpost.org

Two-thousanders of Italy
Mountains of the Alps
Mountains of Italy
Garda Mountains